Thomas Coyle may refer to:

 Thomas Coyle (rugby league) (born 1988), English rugby league
 Tommy Coyle (footballer) (born 1959), footballer
 Thomas Coyle, accused and acquitted of the Murder of George Campbell

See also
 Tommy Coyle (disambiguation)